Joseph Zohar (born 18 April 1948) is the director of Psychiatry and the Anxiety and Obsessive Compulsive Clinic at the Sheba Medical Center in Tel HaShomer and professor of psychiatry at Tel Aviv University, Israel. He is the founder of the World Council on Anxiety as well as the Israeli Consortium on PTSD. He currently leads the chief installation of the Israeli Defense Force for the treatment of PTSD. He is a member of the executive committee of the European College of Neuropsychopharmacology, of which he is a former president, and chairman of the Expert Platform on Mental Health.

Career

Research focus/interests
Dr. Zohar heads the Anxiety Clinic at Sheba Medical Center, which specializes in anxiety disorders such as obsessive-compulsive disorder, post-traumatic stress disorder, and social phobias. In addition to a focus on new treatments, the clinic is interested in the brain function imaging of patients with these anxiety disorders.

Notable contributions to research
Zohar is an expert on post-traumatic stress disorder and has uncovered the potential of secondary prevention in PTSD. His work explores the promising effects of hydrocortisone treatment when administered after the traumatic event in preventing the development of PTSD.

Past appointments
After graduating with his M.D. from Tel Aviv University Sackler School of Medicine, Zohar went on to train in psychiatry at the University of Washington, Seattle, and at the Jerusalem Mental Health Center in Israel. While there, Zohar directed the Resistant Depression Unit.

In 1984, Zohar joined the lab of Dr. Dennis Murphy, at the National Institute of Mental Health in Bethesda, Maryland. He was the acting Director of their Obsessive-Compulsive Clinic.

Awards
Dr. Zohar has received numerous awards, including the Fogarty International Research Fellowship Award (1984), the A. E. Bennet Award for Clinical Research (1986), the  European College of Neuropsychopharmacology Award for Clinical Research (1998), the World Federation of Societies of Biological Psychiatry Award for Excellence in Education (2001), and he is the co-winner of the A.E. Bennett Award for 2002 for a study on an animal model of PTSD.

Positions of trust and research assessments
Zohar was formerly the chairman of the panel for obsessive-compulsive disorders of the American Psychiatric Association Task Force on Treatments of Psychiatric Disorders (1986). In 1992, he established the World Council on Anxiety, known then as the International Council on Anxiety and OCD, and served as its chairman. He is the chair of the Anxiety and Obsessive Compulsive Disorders section of the World Psychiatric Association (WPA).

Since 1995 Zohar has been a member of the executive committee of the ECNP and chairman of the Israel Society for Biological Psychiatry. In 1996 he was nominated as a member of the WHO Expert Advisory Panel on Neuroscience. In 1997 he was elected to the executive committee of the World Federation of Societies of Biological Psychiatry. He is also chairman of the Brussels-based depression and mental health think-tank, the Expert Platform on Mental Health.

Joseph Zohar is on the editorial board of the World Journal of Biological Psychiatry, the CNS Spectrum
and several other journals.

He founded the Israeli consortium on PTSD, is currently the commander of the chief installation of the Israeli Defense Force for treating PTSD, and he is serving as a special advisor to the Ministry of Defense in relation to PTSD.

Publications
He is the author of more than 400 scientific papers and has edited 18 books focusing on refractory depression, obsessive-compulsive disorder, and PTSD.

References

External links 
“European College of Neuropsychopharmacology (ECNP)”
“Sheba Medical Center”

1948 births
Living people
Israeli psychiatrists